I Am Gay and Muslim is a 2012 English-language documentary directed by Chris Belloni. Filmed in Morocco, it follows five gay Muslim men as they explore their religious and sexual identity. The film has been screened in more than a dozen countries.

The cinematography was done by Bram Belloni, the director's brother.

Kyrgyzstan ban 
On September 28, 2012, the documentary was scheduled to be screened at the sixth annual Bir Duino ("One World") film festival in Kyrgyzstan. Immediately before its screening, the State Committee on Religious Affairs asked the Prosecutor General's office to ban the film. It filed suit in the Prevomaiskii District court, which banned the screening due to likelihooding of "incit[ing] religious intolerance".

References 

Moroccan documentary films
2010s English-language films